Granbury High School is a public high school located in the city of Granbury, Texas, United States and classified as a 5A school by the University Interscholastic League (UIL).  It is part of the Granbury Independent School District which serves students grades 9–12 from Granbury, Hood County along with portions of Johnson County and Parker County.  The school was founded around 1870 at a different location. The present high school was built in the 1970s at its current location. It was the first public school in Hood County.  In 2015, the school was rated "Met Standard" by the Texas Education Agency.

Athletics 

The Granbury Pirates compete in these sports - 

Volleyball, Cross Country, Football, Basketball, Powerlifting, Swimming, Soccer, Golf, Tennis, Track, Baseball & Softball

State titles 
Boys Soccer - 
1999(4A)

State finalists
Girls basketball – 
1954(1A), 1955(1A), 1978(2A)
Football – 
1966(2A)

Leta Andrews 
Granbury High School was the home to Leta Andrews, the winningest high school basketball coach in the United States. She won 1416 games during her 52 seasons of coaching, surpassing Robert Hughes, who won 1333 games in his career. She announced her retirement on May 1, 2014.

Notable alumni 
 Brad Hunstable, CEO and co-founder of Linear Labs Former CEO and co-founder of Ustream.tv
 Jia Perkins, former WNBA player
 Dana Vollmer,  four time Olympic gold medalist and world record holder for swimming

References

External links

Granbury ISD 

Education in Hood County, Texas
Public high schools in Texas